University Park, also called Crystal Park, is a public park in the Main South neighborhood of Worcester, Massachusetts. The  park was acquired by the city from 1887 to 1889, costing nearly 62,000 dollars. It is located across Main Street from Clark University, thus the name. University Park Campus School, a local nearby public high school founded with help from Clark, is named after the park.

On September 20, 2010, Clark University announced a "20-year voluntary Payment in Lieu of Taxes agreement" with the City of Worcester, with some of the funds going directly to improvements in University Park. On March 24, 2011, the $1.5 million park redevelopment project was formally announced, and residents were informed that there would be a several-month-long community engagement and participatory planning process.

References 

Parks in Worcester, Massachusetts
Clark University
1887 establishments in Massachusetts